Prindle is an unincorporated community located within the Columbia River Gorge National Scenic Area along the Columbia River in Skamania County, Washington, United States. The community is located on Washington State Route 14 and lies between Washougal to the west and Skamania to the east.

History
The community was named after Ernest Hinsdale Prindle, an early settler. A post office called Prindle was established in 1909, and remained in operation until 1938.

Parks and recreation
The Franz Lake National Wildlife Refuge is east of the community.

References

Unincorporated communities in Skamania County, Washington
Unincorporated communities in Washington (state)